B Resort & Spa is a 394-room non-Disney resort on the property of Walt Disney World Resort in Lake Buena Vista, Florida. It is located near the Disney Springs area on Hotel Plaza Blvd.

Information
The resort originally opened as The Royal Inn on October 1, 1972. In the mid or late 1970s, the hotel's name was changed to the Hotel Royal Plaza  and after a 2012-2014 rebranding, is now known as B Resort & Spa. The hotel has one restaurant, American Kitchen, a poolside bar and lounge, in-room dining, and The Pickup for lighter fare. It also features the B Indulged Spa, which offers a wide array of various spa treatments, and has six different meeting or wedding venues.

The resort was forced to close in August 2004 after sustaining major damage from Hurricane Charley. It reopened in 2006 after receiving a major multimillion-dollar renovation.

On June 4, 2012, B Hotels & Resorts bought the property with plans to renovate and rebrand.  The B Resort & Spa opened June 16, 2014.

References

External links
Hotel's website
Hotel page on disneyworld.com

Hotels in Walt Disney World Resort
Hotels established in 1972
Hotel buildings completed in 1972
1972 establishments in Florida